The United States ambassador to Brunei is the official representative of the president of the United States and the American government to the monarch and government of Brunei. The position is held by Caryn McClelland, who presented her credentials to Sultan Hassanal Bolkiah on May 24, 2022.

History 
Until 1984, Brunei was a self-governing protectorate of the United Kingdom. In 1979 Brunei and the United Kingdom signed a new treaty of friendship and cooperation, and on January 1, 1984, Brunei became a fully independent state.

The United States recognized Brunei immediately. On January 1, 1984, the same day Brunei became independent, the former U.S. Consulate in Bandar Seri Begawan was upgraded to embassy status with Douglas Ellice as Principal Officer and Chargé d’Affaires ad interim. The first ranking U.S. ambassador to Brunei was commissioned on April 12 of the same year.

The United States Embassy in Brunei is located in Bandar Seri Begawan.

List of ambassadors

See also
Brunei–United States relations
Foreign relations of Brunei
Ambassadors of the United States

References

United States Department of State: Background notes on Brunei

External links
 United States Department of State: Chiefs of Mission for Brunei
 United States Department of State: Brunei
 United States Embassy in Bandar Seri Begawan

Brunei
 
United States